The Kawai Q-80 by  Kawai Musical Instruments in 1989, is a music sequencer that has a built in 2DD floppy disk drive for storage. It allows playback, editing, and recording via its MIDI connections. There is a battery backup to hold the configuration when the unit is powered down. The tempo can be set from 40-250 beats per minute.

Active quantisation
Only corrects the notes that are completely out of time with the rest of the track, for a more natural feel and less robotic to the performance.

Connections
 MIDI in, out and Thru.
 Tape sync in and out
 Metronome
 Footswitch input

Storage
Using the units internal S-RAM the Q-80 can hold;
 A total of 26,000 notes, this consists of 10 songs (up to 32 tracks, 15,000 notes per track)
 100 motifs per song (similar to a pattern in a drum machine)

References

External links

Owners manual
 https://drive.google.com/file/d/0B3OQk-sD72jXN3UwUF9tNGF6UmM/view

Kawai synthesizers
Music sequencers
Products introduced in 1989